Ptilium  may refer to:
 Ptilium (beetle), an insect genus in the subfamily Ptiliinae
 Ptilium (plant), a moss genus in the family Hypnaceae
 Ptilium, a genus of Hymenoptera in the unknown family, described in 1827 by Berthold